Bezni Bodaq (also Romanized as Beznī Bodāq; also known as Beznī Bodāgh and Beznī Būdāgh) is a village in Charuymaq-e Shomalesharqi Rural District, in the Central District of Hashtrud County, East Azerbaijan Province, Iran. At the 2006 census, its population was 10, in 4 families.

References 

Towns and villages in Hashtrud County